

1976

See also 
 1976 in Australia
 1976 in Australian television

References

External links 
 Australian film at the Internet Movie Database

1976
Lists of 1976 films by country or language
Films